Flåvatn is a lake in the municipalities of Nome and Kviteseid in Vestfold og Telemark county, Norway.  The lake is the easternmost of the connected lakes Bandak, Kviteseidvatnet and Flåvatn, which are all part of the Telemark Canal.  The lake's area is 20.1 km². The outlet is via the river Straumen (Eidselva) to Norsjø.

References

Lakes of Vestfold og Telemark